Canthigaster inframacula is a species of pufferfish in the family Tetraodontidae. It is native to the Pacific Ocean, where it is known from Japan, the Gulf of Tonkin, and the Hawaiian Islands. It is a benthopelagic oviparous species found at a depth range of 124 to 274 m (407 to 899 ft) and reaches 7.6 cm (3 inches) SL.

References 

inframacula
Fish described in 1977
Fish of Hawaii
Fish of Japan
Fish of the Pacific Ocean